Andrew Godefroy CD, M.A., Ph.D. is a Canadian strategic analyst and science and technology historian.

Scholarship 

Andrew Godefroy was born in Montreal, Quebec and attended Concordia University where he studied Canadian military history. His undergraduate thesis was a study of executions of Canadian soldiers for military crimes in the First World War. He completed a Master's degree and a Ph.D. in War Studies at the Royal Military College of Canada. His graduate and post-graduate studies focused on aerospace history and the Canadian rocketry and space program.

Godefroy held the Canadian Visiting Research Fellowship in the Changing Character of Warfare Program at the University of Oxford in 2009. His research focused on change in the British, American, and Canadian armies since the Cold War period.

Godefroy has been known to be abrupt in his exchanges with other scholars, being described as "intemperate."

Publications
Godefroy's first book, a study of the death penalty in Canada's Canadian Expeditionary Force, was published in 1998. His published doctoral dissertation examined the origins and evolution of Canada's defence space program.  His post-graduate dissertation examined defence innovation amongst the main Western allies, specifically, America, Britain, Canada, Australia, and New Zealand (ABCANZ).

Books 

For Freedom and Honour? The Story of 25 Canadians Executed During the Great War (Ottawa: CEF Books) 1998. 

Bush Warfare: The Early Writings of General Sir William C.G. Heneker KCB KCMG DSO (Kingston: The Army Publishing Office) 2009. 
Link to Book

Great War Commands: Perspectives on Canadian Army Leadership, 1914-1918 (Kingston: Canadian Defence Academy Press), 2010. . Link to Book

Defence & Discovery: Canada's Military Space Program, 1945-1974 (Vancouver: University of British Columbia Press) 2011. .

In Peace Prepared: Innovation and Adaptation in Canada's Cold War Army (Vancouver: University of British Columbia Press) 2014. .

The Canadian Space Program: From Black Brant to the International Space Station (New York: Springer-Praxis Books) 2017. .

Select book chapters 

"Orbital Asset or Overhead Menace? Space Power and Special Operations", in LCol. David Last, Ed. Choice of Force: Special Operations for Canada, (Montreal and Kingston: McGill-Queen's University Press, 2005), 205-218.

"An Overview of Fictional Writing and the Canadian Army of the Future", in DND. Crisis in Zefra. (Kingston: Directorate of Land Concepts and Doctrine, 2005), 127-134.

"The Intangible Defence: Canada's Militarization and Weaponization of Space", in LCol. Bernd Horn, Ed. The Canadian Way of War. (Toronto: Dundurn Group, 2006), 327-357.

"Canadian Military Effectiveness in the First World War", in LCol. Bernd Horn, Ed. The Canadian Way of War. (Toronto: Dundurn Group, 2006), 169-194.

"Trenches Should Never Be Saved: The 4th Canadian Division at Vimy Ridge", in Geoffrey Hayes et al. eds. Vimy Ridge: A Reassessment. (Waterloo: Wilfrid Laurier University Press, 2007), 211-224.

"The German Army at Vimy Ridge", in Geoffrey Hayes et al. eds. Vimy Ridge: A Reassessment. (Waterloo: Wilfrid Laurier University Press, 2007), 225-238.

(With Peter Gizewski) "Force Requirements (Land)", in Brian MacDonald ed. Vimy Papers 2007 – Canada and Arctic Security. Ottawa: CDAI Press, 2007..

"Portrait of a Battalion Commander: Lieutenant Colonel George Stuart Tuxford at the Second Battle of Ypres, April 1915", in Colonel Bernd Horn ed. Intrepid Warriors: Perspectives on Canadian Military Leaders. (Kingston and Toronto: CDA Press and Dundurn Group, 2007), 59-74.

"Daring Innovation: The Canadian Corps and Trench Raiding on the Western Front", in LCol. Bernd Horn, ed. Show No Fear: Daring Actions in Canadian Military History. (Toronto: Dundurn Group, 2008).

"A Clashof Wills: The Canadian Struggle for Mount Sorrell, 2 June 1916", in Col. BerndHorn, ed. Fortune Favours the Brave:Tales of Courage and Tenacity in Canadian Military History. (Toronto:Dundurn Press, 2009), pp. 175–200.

"WartimeMilitary Innovation and the Creation of Canada's Defence Research Board", in Geoff Hayes (ed.). Canada and the SecondWorld War: Essays in Honour of Terry Copp. (Waterloo: Wilfrid LaurierUniversity Press, 2012), pp. 199–218.

"Prometheus Bound: Canada's Defence Space Program in the Year 2025", in Jack L. Granatstein(ed.). The Canadian Forces in 2025:Prospects and Problems. (Victoria, BC: Friesen Press, 2013), pp. 107–134.

Select articles 

"A Lesson in Success: The Calonne Trench Raid, 17 January 1917" Canadian Military History Vol.8 No.2 (Spring 1999), pp. 25–34 Link to Article

"Is the Sky Falling? Canada's Defence Space Program at the Crossroads", Canadian Military Journal Vol.1 No.2 (Summer 2000), pp. 51–58 Link to Article

"Chasing the Silver Bullet: The Evolution of Capability Development in the Canadian Army" Canadian Military Journal Vol.8 No.1 (Spring 2007), pp. 53–66 Link to Article

"From Gentleman Cadet to No Known Grave: The Life and Death of Lieutenant FranklinSharp Rankin, 1894-1916", The CanadianAir Force Journal, Vol.1:3 (Fall 2008), pp. 11–19.

(With Major Alex Ruff) "Forging Land Forces for the Army of Tomorrow: The Battlegroup2021 Study", The Canadian Army Journal, Vol. 11:3 (Fall 2008), pp. 11–19.

"A Force of Reason:Canada, Central America, and the Grupo de Observadores de la Naciones Unidaspara Centro America (ONUCA), 1983-1992", Canadian Military History, Vol.17: 2 (Spring 2008), pp. 5–20.

"Canadian Soldiers in West African Conflicts, 1885-1905", Canadian Military History, Vol.17:1 (Winter2008), pp. 21–36.

"The Royal Military College of Canada and the Education of Officers for the Great War", Canadian Military History, Vol. 18 No.4 (Autumn 2009), pp. 17–31.

"For King, Queen, and Empire: Canadians Recruited into the British Army, 1858-1944", Journal of the Society for Army Historical Research. Vol. 87 No. 350 (Summer 2009), pp. 135–149.

"Letting Clausewitz Go: The Lesson the Canadian Army Must Learn From Afghanistan" Canadian Military Journal Vol.10 No.3 (2010), pp. 53–58 Link to Article

"Allies in Orbit: Files From the RCAF's Cold War Space Program", Air Force Magazine. Vol.37 No.1 (2013), pp. 32–37.

References

Canadian Army officers
20th-century Canadian historians
21st-century Canadian historians
Canadian military historians
Canadian male non-fiction writers
Concordia University alumni
Writers from Montreal
Royal Military College of Canada alumni
Historians of World War I
Living people
1972 births
Military personnel from Montreal